Christianshavns Skoles Rugbyklub-Nanok, commonly known as CSR-Nanok, is a Danish rugby club in Copenhagen. The club has a men's XV team, women's sevens team and youth age grade teams. They train and play their matches at Arsenalvej 2, in Christianshavn.

Honours
Danish Championships
 1987, 1990, 2007, 2009, 2010
Danish Cup
 1983, 1990, 2007, 2009, 2010, 2011, 2012

References

External links
CSR-Nanok

Danish rugby union teams
Sports teams in Copenhagen